Erwin Huber (born 26 July 1946) is a German politician. He was chairman of the Christian Social Union of Bavaria from 2007 to 2008.

Early life
Erwin Huber was born in Reisbach in the district of Dingolfing-Landau, Bavaria. He attended elementary school in Reisbach and a secondary modern in Dingolfing. His first professional job was at the Bavarian administration of the finances in 1963. After several jobs in the financial sector, he entered the Bavarian State Ministry of Finance in 1970. During this period he studied Economics at the University of Munich.

Political career
Huber was elected to the Landtag of Bavaria in 1978 and from 1988 to 1994 was Secretary-General of the Christian Social Union. He entered the Bavarian state government in 1994 and has served as Director of the Bavarian State Chancellery (1993–1994 and 1998–2005), Minister of State for Finance (1994–1998) and Minister of State for Federal Matters and Administrative Reform (2003–2005). In 2005, he was appointed as Bavarian Minister of State for Economics, Transport and Technology, a post he held until 2007 when he was once again appointed Minister of State for Finances.

In September 2007, he was elected chairman of his party. Huber, a loyalist of outgoing chairman Edmund Stoiber, received 58% of the vote, defeating the Federal Agriculture Minister Horst Seehofer, who received 39% of the vote, and party rebel Gabriele Pauli, who gained roughly 3%.

Two days after the state elections of 2008, in which the CSU received only 43,4% of the vote (down from 60,7% in the state elections of 2003), Huber announced his resignation. He was succeeded by Horst Seehofer.

Personal life
Erwin Huber is a Roman Catholic and is married with two children.

References

External links
Official site 

1946 births
Living people
Ministers of the Bavaria State Government
Politicians from Bavaria
Leaders of political parties in Germany
German Roman Catholics
Christian Social Union in Bavaria politicians
Ludwig Maximilian University of Munich alumni